Paul Beynon-Davies (born 1957) is a British academic, author and consultant.

Biography
Born in the Rhondda, Wales, he received his BSc in Economics and Social Science and PhD in Computing from University of Wales College, Cardiff.

Before taking up an academic post he worked for several years in the ICT industry in the UK as a programmer and business analyst both in the public and private sectors. He entered academia in the mid 1980s and has held positions at the University of Glamorgan, Swansea University and most recently at Cardiff University.
His inter-disciplinary interests began with this PhD thesis which considered the application of computing in ethnography. Over nearly three decades of work he has published on a wide range of topics ranging from the nature of informatics, electronic business, electronic government, information systems planning, information systems development and database systems. Details of some of these publications are included below.

His most recent programme of work involves considering the fundamental nature of informatics in terms of the intersection of signs and systems. Some of this work has already been published

A book describing this work is published by Palgrave/Macmillan.

More recently he has been developing a new design theory for business analysis which is theory-driven but practical in application.

A book exploring the constitutive nature of data within society has recently been published.

Paul Beynon-Davies is currently professor emeritus at the Cardiff business school, Cardiff university and still lives in South Wales. He is married with three children.

Books
 Beynon-Davies P. (1992). Systemes d'information. Afnor. Translated by David Avison.
 Beynon-Davies P. (1991). Expert Database Systems: A Gentle Introduction. McGraw-Hill, Basingstoke.
 Beynon-Davies P. (1991). Relational Database Systems. McGraw-Hill, Basingstoke.
 Beynon-Davies P. (1992). Knowledge Engineering for Information Systems. McGraw-Hill, Basingstoke.
 Beynon-Davies P. (1992). Relational Database Design. McGraw-Hill, Basingstoke.
 Beynon-Davies P. (1997). Analysing Information Systems Failures: a practical approach. Pitman/THES Publications, London, UK.
 Beynon-Davies P. (1998). Information Systems Development: an introduction to information systems engineering. 3rd Ed. Macmillan.
 Beynon-Davies, P. (1998). Systemy Baz Danych. Warsaw, Wydawnictwa Naukowo-Techniczne.
 Beynon-Davies, P. (1999). Inzynieria Systemow Informacyjnych. Warsaw, Wydawnictwa Naukowo-Techniczne.
 Beynon-Davies P. (2002). Information Systems: an introduction to informatics in Organisations. Palgrave, Basingstoke, UK. 
 Beynon-Davies P. (2004). E-Business. Palgrave, Basingstoke. 
 Beynon-Davies P. (2004). Database Systems 3rd Edition. Palgrave, Basingstoke, UK. 
 Beynon-Davies P. (2011)  Significance: Exploring the Nature of Information, Systems and Technology 
 Beynon-Davies P. (2013). Business Information Systems. 2nd edition. Palgrave, Basingstoke. 
 Beynon-Davies P. (2013). eBusiness. 2nd edition. Palgrave, Basingstoke. 
 Beynon-Davies P. (2019). Business Information Systems. 3rd edition. Red Globe Press. 
 Beynon-Davies P. (2021). Business analysis and design: understanding innovation in organisation. Palgrave Macmillan. 
 Beynon-Davies P. (2021). Data and society. World Scientific publishing.

References

External links
 Cardiff Business School staff page

1957 births
Living people
Academics of Cardiff Business School